The 1941 Manhattan Jaspers football team was an American football team that represented Manhattan College as an independent during the 1941 college football season.  In its fourth season under head coach Herb Kopf, the team compiled a 4–4–1 record and was outscored by a total of 116 to 98.

Schedule

References

Manhattan
Manhattan Jaspers football seasons
Manhattan Jaspers football